The bean weevils or seed beetles are a subfamily (Bruchinae) of beetles, now placed in the family Chrysomelidae, though they have historically been treated as a separate family. They are granivores, and typically infest various kinds of seeds or beans, living most of their lives inside a single seed. The subfamily includes about 1,650 species and are found worldwide.

Bean weevils are generally compact and oval in shape, with small heads somewhat bent under. Sizes range from 1 to 22 mm for some tropical species. Colors are usually black or brown, often with mottled patterns. Although their mandibles may be elongated, they do not have the long snouts characteristic of true weevils.

Adults deposit eggs on seeds, then the larvae chew their way into the seed. When ready to pupate, the larvae typically cut an exit hole, then return to their feeding chamber. Adult weevils have a habit of feigning death and dropping from a plant when disturbed.

Host plants tend to be legumes, but species will also be found in Convolvulaceae, Arecaceae, and Malvaceae, and several species are considered pests.

One characteristic of the beetles which can be seen in the photo is that the elytra are short, not quite reaching the tip of the abdomen.

Several species are native to Great Britain, but there are also records of several introduced species from stored products in warehouses and dwellings, although these species cannot proliferate outside of heated buildings in that climate.

Genera
This list of genera uses the new classification, treating the bean weevils as a subfamily with six extant tribes, eight or nine subtribes, and one extinct tribe. The former names and ranks for the tribes and subtribes under the old classification, treating the been weevils as a family, are given in parentheses (except for Myanmaropini, which was established only for the new classification).

 Tribe Amblycerini Bridwell, 1932 (= Subfamily Amblycerinae)
 Subtribe Amblycerina Bridwell, 1932 (= Tribe Amblycerini)
 Amblycerus Thunberg, 1815
 Subtribe Spermophagina Borowiec, 1987 (= Tribe Spermophagini)
 Spermophagus Schoenherr, 1833
 Zabrotes Horn, 1885
 Tribe Bruchini Latreille, 1802 (= Subfamily Bruchinae)
 Subtribe Acanthoscelidina Bridwell, 1946 (= Tribe Acanthoscelidini)
 Abutiloneus Bridwell, 1946
 Acanthoscelides Schilsky, 1905
 Algarobius Bridwell, 1946
 Althaeus Bridwell, 1946
 Bonaerius Bridwell, 1952
 Caryedes Hummel, 1827
 Cosmobruchus Bridwell, 1931
 Ctenocolum Kingsolver & Whitehead, 1974
 Dahlibruchus Bridwell, 1931
 Gibbobruchus Pic, 1913
 Lithraeus Bridwell, 1952
 Margaritabruchus Romero & Johnson, 2001
 Meibomeus Bridwell, 1946
 Megasennius Whitehead & Kingsolver, 1975
 Merobruchus Bridwell, 1946
 Mimosestes Bridwell, 1946
 Neltumius Bridwell, 1946
 Neobruchidius Johnson & Romero, 2006
 Palpibruchus Borowiec, 1987
 Pectinibruchus Kingsolver, 1967
 Penthobruchus Kingsolver, 1973
 Pseudopachymerina Zacher, 1952
 Pygiopachymerus Pic, 1911
 Rhipibruchus Bridwell, 1932
 Scutobruchus Kingsolver, 1968
 Sennius Bridwell, 1946
 Spatulobruchus Borowiec, 1987
 Stator Bridwell, 1946
 Stylantheus Bridwell, 1946
 Subtribe Bruchidiina Bridwell, 1946 (= Tribe Bruchidiini)
 Acanthobruchidius Borowiec, 1980
 Borowiecus Anton, 1994
 Bruchidius Schilsky, 1905
 Callosobruchus Pic, 1902
 Conicobruchus Decelle, 1951
 Decellebruchus Borowiec, 1987
 Horridobruchus Borowiec, 1984
 Kingsolverius Borowiec, 1987
 Megabruchidius Borowiec, 1984
 Palaeoacanthoscelides Borowiec, 1985
 Parasulcobruchus Anton, 1999
 Pygobruchidius Pic, 1951
 Salviabruchus Decelle, 1982
 Specularius Bridwell, 1938
 Sulcobruchus  Chûjô, 1937
 Tuberculobruchus Decelle, 1951
 Subtribe Bruchina Latreille, 1802 (= Tribe Bruchini)
 Bruchus Linnaeus, 1767
 Subtribe Megacerina Bridwell, 1946 (= Tribe Megacerini)
 Megacerus Fåhraeus, 1839
 Tribe Eubaptini Bridwell, 1932 (= Subfamily Eubaptinae)
 Eubaptus Lacordaire, 1945
 Tribe Kytorhinini Bridwell, 1832 (= Subfamily Kytorhininae)
 Kytorhinus Fischer von Waldheim, 1809
 Tribe Pachymerini Bridwell, 1929 (= Subfamily Pachymerinae)
 Subtribe Caryedontina Bridwell, 1929 (= Tribe Caryedontini)
 Aforedon Decelle, 1965
 Caryedon Schoenherr, 1823
 Caryotrypes Decelle, 1968
 Exoctenophorus Decelle, 1968
 Mimocaryedon Decelle, 1968
 Subtribe Caryopemina Bridwell, 1929 (= Tribe Caryomepini)
 Caryopemon Jekel, 1855
 Diedobruchus Pic, 1913
 Protocaryopemon  Borowiec, 1987
 Subtribe Pachymerina Bridwell, 1929 (= Tribe Pachymerini)
 Butiobruchus Prevett, 1966
 Caryobruchus Bridwell, 1929
 Caryoborus Schoenherr, 1833
 Pachymerus Thunberg, 1805
†Mesopachymerus Poinar, 2005 Canadian amber, Campanian
 Tribe Rhaebini Chapuis, 1874 (= Subfamily Rhaebinae)
 Rhaebus Fischer von Waldheim, 1824
 Tribe †Myanmaropini Legalov et al., 2020
†Myanmarops Legalov et al., 2020 Burmese amber, Myanmar, Cenomanian

See also
Caryobruchus gleditsiae

Notes

References

 John M. Kingsolver, "Bruchidae", in Ross H. Arnett, Jr. and Michael C. Thomas, American Beetles (CRC Press, 2002), vol. 2 (note that this reference itself indicates the group is a subfamily, and the change was made only after the chapter was written)

External links

 BRUCHBASE

 
Storage pests